St. Mary's Church is a historic former Catholic church in the Lawrenceville neighborhood of Pittsburgh, Pennsylvania. It was built in 1874 and was added to the List of Pittsburgh History and Landmarks Foundation Historic Landmarks in 1971. The St. Mary's Church property also includes the St. Mary's Academy building, a Pittsburgh historic landmark.

In 1993, St. Mary's parish merged with three other Lawrenceville parishes (Holy Family, St. Augustine, and St. John the Baptist) in 1993 to form the Our Lady of Angels parish. St. Mary's Church remained in use by the new parish for a few years, but closed in 2004 when operations were consolidated at St. Augustine. In 2007 the former St. Mary's buildings were purchased by the Catholic Cemeteries Association, which administers the adjacent St. Mary Cemetery. The church building was converted into a chapel for the cemetery.

References

Roman Catholic churches in Pittsburgh
Roman Catholic churches completed in 1874
19th-century Roman Catholic church buildings in the United States
1870s architecture in the United States
Religious organizations established in 1874
Lawrenceville (Pittsburgh)
Pittsburgh History & Landmarks Foundation Historic Landmarks
Former Roman Catholic church buildings in Pennsylvania